Mattias Rydberg (born December 3, 1985) is a Swedish Bandy player who currently plays for Västerås SK as a forward.  Mattias was a youth product of Västerås SK and made his first team debut in the 2003/04 season.  Mattias played for the Sweden U19 squad during the 2003/04 season.

Mattias has played for two clubs, they are:-
 Västerås SK (2003-2004)
 Västanfors IF (2004-2005)
 Västerås SK (2005-)

External links
  mattias rydberg at bandysidan
  västerås sk

Swedish bandy players
Living people
1985 births
Västerås SK Bandy players
Västanfors IF players